The Civic Solidarity Party (VHP) is a political party in Azerbaijan. It was founded in 1992. The party's leader is Sabir Rustamkhanli, who is originally a poet. The party's ideology is based on the "universal political values of freedom, equality and solidarity".

At the 2010 parliamentary elections, it won 3 out of 125 seats. In the 2015 parliamentary elections, it won 2 out of 125 seats. In the 2020 parliamentary elections, it won 3 out of 125 seats.

References

External links
Official website 

1992 establishments in Azerbaijan
Conservative parties in Azerbaijan
National conservative parties
Nationalist parties in Azerbaijan
Political parties established in 1992
Political parties in Azerbaijan